is a Japanese footballer who currently plays for Nankatsu SC.

Club statistics
Updated to 30 November 2017.

References

External links

Profile at Hokkaido Consadole Sapporo

1986 births
Living people
Association football people from Hokkaido
Japanese footballers
J1 League players
J2 League players
Hokkaido Consadole Sapporo players
Ehime FC players
Association football midfielders